Dame Diane Elizabeth Robertson  (née Coburn; born 11 May 1953) is a New Zealand community leader. She was the Auckland City Missioner from 1998 until 2015, and was the first woman to serve in the role.

Biography
Robertson was born in Waipukurau in 1953, the daughter of Joan Lois Coburn and her husband Alexander Lawrence Coburn. She was educated at Tararua College, and then studied at Palmerston North Teachers' College where she gained a Diploma of Teaching. She met her husband, Wilfred Holt, when she was teaching at Waiouru Military Camp and he was serving in the army, and they married in 1975. They would go on to have three children.

In 1998, Robertson was appointed the Auckland City Missioner, having previously been a teacher, counsellor and involved in youth work and a manager of a social services agency. She was the first woman and first non-cleric to hold the role. In September 2015 she announced that she would step down from that post at the end of 2015.

Robertson is chair of the Data Futures Partnership, chair of the Goodman Fielder Cares Foundation and a member of the Vulnerable Children's Board.

Honours
Robertson was awarded the New Zealand 1990 Commemoration Medal in 1990. In the 2015 Queen's Birthday Honours, she was appointed a Dame Companion of the New Zealand Order of Merit, for services to the community.

Robertson is a Paul Harris Fellow.

References

1953 births
Living people
People from Waipukurau
People educated at Tararua College
Dames Companion of the New Zealand Order of Merit
New Zealand community activists